Purgatory, also known as Purgatory West of the Pecos, is a 1999 American Western fantasy television film directed by Uli Edel. The film premiered on TNT on January 10, 1999. It focuses on a gang of outlaws who find their way to a hidden valley and a peaceful town where residents shun swearing, alcohol, guns and any kind of violence but resemble dead Western heroes. The outcome is marked by its exploration of the interface between legend-making and humanitarian values.

Plot
A violent outlaw band led by Blackjack Britton and Cavin Guthrie robs a bank. During the subsequent gunfight, a prostitute named Dolly Sloan is shot and dies in the arms of Cavin's nephew, Sonny. The gang flees, pursued by a posse, and manages to escape through a dust storm by following a tunnel into a green valley. The town of Refuge welcomes them, but they are puzzled by the residents, who do not carry guns or swear, and who flock to the church whenever the bell tolls.

The youngest gang member, Sonny, thinks he recognizes some of them from the dime novels he reads. He befriends a woman named Rose who deflects his questions and asks some pointed ones of her own, beginning with “How many men have you killed?” The rest of the outlaws occupy the saloon and begin causing trouble. One of the gang members is struck by lightning when he prepares to throw his knife at the church door. His body is carried away by a Native American, who guards the gates to a mist-filled property outside of town.

As Sonny investigates further, he realizes that the town appears to be occupied by former notorious gunfighters. These include Wild Bill Hickok, the town's Sheriff, Jesse James, Billy the Kid and Doc Holliday, although they deny their identities to Sonny. Later he talks to a gardener named Lamb whom he prompts to admit who he really is. Before Sonny can ask more questions, some of Blackjack's men tear up Lamb's garden. Enraged, he beats one to death with his shovel and is led away by the mysterious Gatekeeper.

While talking to Doc, Sonny lets slip the true nature of their gang and the Sheriff asks them to saddle up and leave town. Blackjack orders all his men to assemble in the saloon except Sonny, who is ejected but steals back and overhears the gang planning to rob the town on their way out, while Cavin plans to rape Rose. Sonny joins the townspeople in church, where he begs them to defend themselves. They finally admit to Sonny that Refuge is a form of Purgatory. If they can go ten years while resisting the temptations of their former lives, they are admitted to Heaven. They are therefore reluctant to face off against Blackjack's gang because it will cost them their respite. A frustrated Sonny leaves the church and is jumped by Blackjack and Cavin, who beat him unconscious.

The next morning, a battered Sonny straps on his guns and prepares to face Blackjack's gang alone.  The townspeople are summoned by the church bells, but while most of them comply, Hickok, Holliday, James, and Billy all join Sonny, inspired by his willingness to die to protect Rose. A shootout erupts, during which Blackjack's gang are all slaughtered, but Cavin manages to shoot Sonny before being killed by him in return. Sonny, despite being fatally wounded, does not feel pain and does not die. Hickok welcomes him to Refuge, realizing that Sonny has earned his second chance. When Blackjack arrives and challenges Hickok, he loses. "I guess I'm one of you now," Blackjack jokes, realizing the truth of the situation. "I wouldn't count on it," Hickok replies before finally dispatching his opponent.

The Gatekeeper carries the bodies of Cavin and Blackjack beyond the misty gates to the edge of a fiery pit, into which they are thrown screaming. Hickok and the others grimly follow, but the stagecoach arrives and the driver tells them that by their willingness to sacrifice their chance of a better future to protect the others, they have secured a place in Heaven. "The Creator may be tough, but He ain't blind," he says. Sonny asks to stay behind with Rose, and Hickok hands him the Sheriff's badge.  The coach then leaves, riding upwards into the light.

Cast
 Sam Shepard as Sheriff Forrest / 'Wild Bill' Hickok
 Eric Roberts as Jack 'Blackjack' Britton
 Randy Quaid as Doc Woods / 'Doc' Holliday
 Peter Stormare as Cavin Guthrie
 Brad Rowe as Leon 'Sonny' Miller
 Donnie Wahlberg as Deputy Glen / Billy 'The Kid'
 J.D. Souther as Brooks / Jesse James
 Amelia Heinle as Rose / Betty McCullough
 Shannon Kenny as Ivy / Dolly Sloan
 John Dennis Johnston as Lamb / Jack 'Lefty' Slade
 Saginaw Grant as The Gatekeeper
 R.G. Armstrong as The Stagecoach Driver
 Richard Edson as Euripides
 Gregory Scott Cummins as Knox
 John Diehl as 'Badger' Britton
 Michael Shaner as Jacinto
 Les Lannom as Bartender

Production
Writer Gordon Dawson had worked on several westerns previously, and was inspired to write a religious morality tale set in an Old West town inhabited by ghosts. The film was shot on the backlot of Warner Brothers studios during the summer of 1998, on 35mm.

Director Uli Edel had always wanted to direct a western but was aware of the genre's dwindling popularity with the major Hollywood film studios in the late 1990s, as were Purgatory's producers.<ref>Staci D. Kramer, “TNT Rides Again”, [https://www-chicagotribune-com.cdn.ampproject.org/v/s/www.chicagotribune.com/news/ct-xpm-1999-01-10-9901100393-story,amp.html?amp_js_v=a2&amp_gsa=1&usqp=mq331AQCCAE%3D#referrer=https%3A%2F%2Fwww.google.com&amp_tf=From%20%251%24s&ampshare=https%3A%2F%2Fwww.chicagotribune.com%2Fnews%2Fct-xpm-1999-01-10-9901100393-story.html Chicago Tribune Chicago Tribune, 10 January 1999]</ref> It was Edel's involvement in directing which convinced Sam Shepard to agree to star, feeling that as a European Edel would bring different ideas to the film. Shepard described the filming as difficult because of the short shooting schedule available.

Brad Fiedel had worked with Uli Edel previously and the two agreed that the film's music should "support the classic western elements of the project and not overplay the otherworldly elements so that the audience could enjoy discovering the strangeness of what was really going on in this seemingly normal town without the score telegraphing it too much".

ReceptionPurgatory was first aired by TNT Network on January 10, 1999. The movie was advertised and marketed as "Not your ordinary damn western".Variety gave the film a positive review, praising the story and Sam Shepard's performance in particular. The New York Times'  Anita Gates was also enthusiastic about this “fascinating, deceptively dark western with more than a touch of The Twilight Zone,''  observing that “Gordon Dawson's script makes the process satisfying despite the fact that any viewer who has noticed the title of the film knows the answer from the beginning”.  When it was shown in Britain, Radio Times described the film as “a barmy but richly enjoyable western fable”.

Hugh H. Davis later provided a chapter examining Purgatory's surreal and religious themes in the compilation Undead in the West. This is a wry meditation on the changes rung on legend in the film, where the heroes portrayed had already been immortalized by reputation while still alive; now they are ‘dead’ they must earn their immortal redemption by giving up everything that had earned them their reputation in the first place. Parallels are also drawn between the dime novels that contributed to the making of the Western legends, of which Sonny Dillard is an avid reader, and the celluloid embroidering of the same legends. High Noon in particular, the prototype of the climactic final shootout, had gone through many variations in later films, and references to several of these exist in Purgatory. But informing everything else there is Dante's Purgatorio'', the theology of which permeates Uli Edel's film, according to Davis.

References

External links
 

1999 television films
1999 films
1990s English-language films
1999 fantasy films
1999 Western (genre) films
American Western (genre) fantasy films
American Western (genre) television films
Cultural depictions of Billy the Kid
Cultural depictions of Doc Holliday
Cultural depictions of Jesse James
Cultural depictions of Wild Bill Hickok
Films directed by Uli Edel
Films scored by Brad Fiedel
Films set in ghost towns
Fiction about purgatory
TNT Network original films